Luis Pedro da Silva Ferreira (born 6 January 1992 in Malanje, Angola) is an Angolan-Dutch formerly professional footballer. He plays as a centre back. Pedro is a resident of Rotterdam.

Club career

Helpman, Groningen and Veendam 
Pedro played in the youth of VV Helpman and transferred to the FC Groningen youth in 2005. He played for FC Groningen U21 and the first squad, where he had his Eredivisie debut in 2012 as a substitute. His three other games in the top team were full length.

During the 2012–13 season, Pedro was loaned to SC Veendam in the Eerste Divisie. Here Pedro became a base-team player. Coincidentally, Veendam went bankrupt before this season was over. After Veendam folded, Pedro played extra games for the FC Groningen U21 team until the season was really over.

Emmen, NAC and De Graafschap 
A free player, Pedro transferred to the Eerste Divisie side FC Emmen, The Emmen stint lasted 2 seasons, during which he played 72 league games and also scored 3 goals. In 2015 he helped Emmen reach the promotion playoffs.

Next season, at NAC Breda, he was the only player not to miss any playing time in the league games of the 2015–16 season's first half. He also scored 4 goals. At the De Graafschap, in the 2016–2017 season, Pedro played only 3 games due to an injury.

Leonidas, Tsarsko Selo and ASWH 
From 2018 to 2020, Pedro played for Hoofdklasse-side RKSV Leonidas of Rotterdam. During the 2020–21 season, he played for Tsarsko Selo Sofia, resulting in 21 caps in the Bulgarian First League.

A 2022 trial with Derde Divisie-side SteDoCo did not lead to a contract. In late 2022, Pedro started training at trailing Derde Divisie club ASWH, culminating in a contract from January to June 2023.

References

External links
 

1992 births
Living people
Footballers from Malanje
Angolan footballers
Association football defenders
FC Groningen players
SC Veendam players
FC Emmen players
NAC Breda players
De Graafschap players
FC Tsarsko Selo Sofia players
Eredivisie players
Eerste Divisie players
First Professional Football League (Bulgaria) players
Expatriate footballers in Bulgaria
Derde Divisie players
ASWH players
Vierde Divisie players